Hugo Ernesto Pérez Granados (born November 8, 1963) is a former professional footballer and current manager of the El Salvador national team. Born in El Salvador, he represented the United States national team.

During his fourteen-year career, he played professionally in the United States, France, Sweden, Saudi Arabia and his native El Salvador. Although born in El Salvador, he gained his U.S. citizenship as a youth and earned 73 caps, scoring sixteen goals, with the U.S. national team between 1984 and 1994. He was a member of the U.S. team at both the 1984 Summer Olympics and the 1994 FIFA World Cup. He was the 1991 U.S. Soccer Athlete of the Year and was inducted into the National Soccer Hall of Fame in 2008.

Early life 
Pérez was born in El Salvador, where both his grandfather and father both played professionally for C.D. FAS, the club with which Pérez would finish his career.  He migrated with his family to the United States when he was 11 and gained his U.S. citizenship in the mid-1980s.  He chose to forego college.

Club career 
In 1982, Pérez signed with the Los Angeles Aztecs of the NASL. He also spent time with the Tampa Bay Rowdies before ending up with the San Diego Sockers. In 1988, he was the championship MVP when the Sockers won the MISL championship. That summer he joined Ajax during the team's pre-season. Ajax manager Johan Cruyff expressed an interest in signing him, but the Sockers refused to release Pérez.  In 1989, he played for the Los Angeles Heat of the Western Soccer Alliance.

Cruyff then attempted to work a transfer for Pérez to Italian club Parma in 1990, but Parma needed Pérez to play in the World Cup in order to get him a work permit. Pérez was part of the 1990 World Cup Roster, but when U.S. coach Gansler left Pérez off the U.S. team that traveled, due to a question of match fitness due to injury, this nixed the move to Italy. Instead, Pérez moved to France where he played with Red Star Paris. From France, Pérez moved to Swedish First Division club Örgryte IS then Saudi Arabian First Division club Al-Ittihad.

In 1994, he returned to the United States and played in the 1994 World Cup and after played for the Los Angeles Salsa of the American Professional Soccer League. Hugo played with the Salsa while negotiating a contract with C.D FAS. The Salsa folded at the end of the 1994 season and Pérez made his last move, to Primera División de Fútbol de El Salvador club C.D. FAS, commonly known as C.D. FAS. In both of Pérez' years with the club, 1994–1995 and 1995–1996, C.D. FAS won the El Salvador championship. He retired in 1996 from professional soccer.

International career
Pérez was a member of the American squad that competed at the 1983 FIFA World Youth Championship and 1984 Summer Olympics. He also helped the USA qualify for the 1988 Summer Olympics and the 1990 FIFA World Cup, which he missed when he tore ligaments in his leg playing for Red Star Paris, a French Second Division club. He was named U.S. Soccer Athlete of the Year in 1991. He played 73 international matches for the US between 1984 and 1994, in which he scored thirteen goals. At the 1994 FIFA World Cup, Pérez played in the second round game against Brazil.

Retirement
After retiring from playing, Pérez moved to the San Francisco area where he has served as the principal for the Living Hope Christian School. On March 10, 2008, Pérez was elected to the National Soccer Hall of Fame.

He is the uncle of UD Ibiza and El Salvador U-23 player, Joshua Pérez.

Coaching career
In August 2002, he joined the University of San Francisco as an assistant coach to its men's soccer team. On December 7, 2007, the California Victory, a USL First Division expansion franchise, announced that Pérez had joined its staff as an assistant coach.

United States U-15
Pérez was coach of the U15s from August 7, 2012 to August 23, 2014. He resigned afterwards. He stated "Yes, this is my last camp, I don't know [what is next for me]; that is up to U.S. Soccer. Obviously, I'm employed by them and whatever they do I am open to it. It's been an honor to work with these kids and an honor to get to know them."

El Salvador
After Albert Roca resigned as coach of El Salvador in July 2015, Pérez once again expressed his interest in coaching El Salvador. On August 21, 2015, it was announced that Pérez has been hired as the new assistant coach of El Salvador to Jorge Rodríguez. In April 2021, after having coached the El Salvador under-23 national team, Pérez was named head coach of the senior team, the first American to coach El Salvador after 91 years. Under this tutelage, El Salvador began recruiting players born in the United States to Salvadoran parents, who later made up a quarter of their World Cup qualifying roster in 2021.

Personal life
His nephew Joshua Pérez is a professional soccer player who plays for American side Miami FC.

Career statistics

International

Scores and results list the United States' goal tally first, score column indicates score after each Pérez goal.

Honors
San Diego Sockers
North American Soccer League: 1984–85, 1985–86, 1987–88, 1988–89, 1989–90

FAS
Primera División de Fútbol de El Salvador: 1994–95, 1995–96

United States
CONCACAF Gold Cup: 1991

Individual
U.S. Soccer Athlete of the Year: 1991
Fútbol de Primera Player of the Year: 1991

References 

  (article about Perez's attempts to join Ajax in July 1988, Sockers reaction)

External links
 BigSoccer discussion board on Hugo Pérez
 USSoccerPlayers bio of Pérez
 Photo of Pérez at 1994 World Cup
 California Victory Story
 NASL stats
 

1963 births
Living people
Salvadoran emigrants to the United States
People with acquired American citizenship
People from Morazán Department
American soccer players
Association football midfielders
Los Angeles Aztecs players
Tampa Bay Rowdies (1975–1993) players
San Diego Sockers (NASL) players
San Diego Sockers (original MISL) players
Los Angeles Heat players
Red Star F.C. players
Örgryte IS players
Ittihad FC players
Los Angeles Salsa players
C.D. FAS footballers
North American Soccer League (1968–1984) players
North American Soccer League (1968–1984) indoor players
Major Indoor Soccer League (1978–1992) players
Western Soccer Alliance players
American Professional Soccer League players
Ligue 2 players
Allsvenskan players
Ettan Fotboll players
Saudi Professional League players
Salvadoran Primera División players
National Soccer Hall of Fame members
United States men's under-20 international soccer players
Olympic soccer players of the United States
United States men's international soccer players
Footballers at the 1984 Summer Olympics
1991 CONCACAF Gold Cup players
1992 King Fahd Cup players
1994 FIFA World Cup players
CONCACAF Gold Cup-winning players
American expatriate soccer players
American expatriate sportspeople in France
American expatriate sportspeople in Sweden
American expatriate sportspeople in Saudi Arabia
Expatriate footballers in France
Expatriate footballers in Saudi Arabia
Expatriate footballers in Sweden
American soccer coaches
San Francisco Dons men's soccer coaches
El Salvador national football team managers
USL First Division coaches
2021 CONCACAF Gold Cup managers
American expatriate soccer coaches
California Victory